Kleinfelder, Inc. is an engineering, construction management, design and environmental professional services firm. Kleinfelder operates over 100 office locations in the United States, Canada, and Australia. The company headquarters is located in San Diego, California. Kleinfelder is ranked 67th in Engineering News-Record's  2019 Top 500 Design Firm rankings.

History
In 1961, the company was founded by Jim Kleinfelder in Stockton, California under the name of Stockton Testing and Controls. The company was primarily involved in construction materials testing.

In September 2016, George J. Pierson, former CEO of Parsons Brinckerhoff, was named CEO of Kleinfelder, replacing Kevin Pottmeyer, the company's interim president and CEO.'

In December 2018, a majority stake in the firm was acquired by Wind Point Partners, a private equity firm based in Chicago.

In September 2019, Louis Armstrong was named president and CEO of Kleinfelder, and George Pierson (former CEO) became Kleinfelder's executive chairman.

Markets

Kleinfelder's primary markets are identified as:
Energy
Facilities
Federal
Transportation
Water

Notable projects

Kleinfelder was founded in 1961. The company is made up of engineers, scientists, and construction professionals in the sectors of transportation, water, energy, and other private infrastructure. Projects within the markets the company serves include:

Energy Market:
Oil and Gas Projects
Power Projects

Private/Facilities Market:
Commercial Projects
Industrial Projects
Institutional Projects

Transportation Market:
Aviation Projects
Marine Ports & Harbor Projects
Rail & Mass Transit Projects
Surface Transportation Projects

Water Market:
Dam Projects
Levee Projects
Water Infrastructure Projects

Government/Federal Market:
State and Local Government Projects
US Air Force Projects
US Army Corps of Engineers Projects
US Navy Projects

References

External links
 
 Company Profile on Bloomberg Business

Engineering companies of the United States
Companies based in San Diego
Technology companies established in 1961
1961 establishments in California
2018 mergers and acquisitions